{{Infobox video game
| title = Tennis
| image = Tennis (video game).jpg
| caption = North American NES cover art
| developer = Nintendo EADIntelligent Systems
| publisher = Nintendo
| designer = Shigeru Miyamoto
| platforms = 
| released = {{Unbulleted list | Famicom/NES  Vs. Tennis (arcade)  | }}
| genre = Sports
| modes = Single-player, multiplayer
| arcade system = Nintendo VS. System
| producer = Masayuki Uemura
| programmer = Kenji Nakajima
| composer = Yukio Kaneoka
}}

 is a sports video game developed by Nintendo in 1983, and released for the Family Computer (Famicom) in 1984. The arcade game version Vs. Tennis was also released for the Nintendo VS. System in 1984, becoming a hit at Japanese and American arcades that year; it was the sixth top-performing arcade game of 1984 in the United States. Tennis is one of 17 launch games for the Nintendo Entertainment System (NES) in North America and Europe. The game was re-released for the Game Boy as a launch game in North America.

Gameplay 
The game features single-player and two-player modes for singles and doubles matches, with either competitive or cooperative gameplay. A computerized opponent's artificial intelligence can be set to one of five difficulty levels. Mario is the referee.

Development and release
In 1983, the Famicom had only three launch games, and its library would total seven, including Tennis. Shigeru Miyamoto said he was "directly in charge of the character design and the game design". The game was developed in 1983.

In 1984, it was included in the Nintendo VS. System arcade game series under the name , which released in Japan on January 18, 1984. In 1985, Hudson Soft published Tennis for the PC-8801. It was re-released for the North American launch of the Nintendo Entertainment System in October 1985. Nintendo ported the game to the Game Boy in 1989, and to the Nintendo e-Reader in 2002.

The NES version is embedded in the life simulation game Animal Crossing (2001), and in the party video game WarioWare: Twisted! (2004) as one of 9-Volt's minigames. For the Virtual Console, Nintendo republished the NES version to the Wii in 2006 and the Wii U in 2013 and the Game Boy version to the Nintendo 3DS in 2011. This version was added to Nintendo Switch Online in late 2018.

Reception 
In Japan, Game Machine listed VS. Tennis in its March 15, 1984 issue as the most successful table arcade cabinet of the month. It again topped the Game Machine table arcade game charts in April and May 1984. In the United States, Vs. Tennis topped the arcade software conversion kit charts of RePlay (July 1984) and Play Meter (August 1984). It became the sixth top-performing arcade game of 1984 in the United States. In Europe, it had become a very popular arcade game by 1986.

Notes

References

See also 

 Jimmy Connors Tennis (1993)
 List of Nintendo Entertainment System games
 Super Tennis (1991)
 Top Players' Tennis (1990)

External links 
 Tennis at NinDB
 Tennis Game Boy（Japanese）

1984 video games
Famicom Disk System games
Game Boy games
Hudson Soft games
Intelligent Systems games
Multiplayer and single-player video games
NEC PC-8001 games
NEC PC-8801 games
Nintendo arcade games
Nintendo e-Reader games
Nintendo Entertainment System games
Nintendo Research & Development 1 games
Nintendo Vs. Series games
PlayChoice-10 games
Sharp X1 games
Tennis video games
Video games developed in Japan
Virtual Console games for Wii
Virtual Console games for Nintendo 3DS
Virtual Console games for Wii U
Video games designed by Shigeru Miyamoto
Nintendo Switch Online games